Sustainable Development Goal 11 (SDG 11 or Global Goal 11), titled "sustainable cities and communities", is one of 17 Sustainable Development Goals established by the United Nations General Assembly in 2015. The official mission of SDG 11 is to "Make cities inclusive, safe, resilient and sustainable". The 17 SDGs take into account that action in one area will affect outcomes in other areas as well, and that development must balance social, economic and environmental sustainability.

SDG 11 has 10 targets to be achieved, and this is being measured with 15 indicators. The seven outcome targets include safe and affordable housing, affordable and sustainable transport systems, inclusive and sustainable urbanization, protection of the world's cultural and natural heritage, reduction of the adverse effects of natural disasters, reduction of the environmental impacts of cities and to provide access to safe and inclusive green and public spaces. The three means of implementation targets include strong national and regional development planning, implementing policies for inclusion, resource efficiency, and disaster risk reduction in supporting the least developed countries in sustainable and resilient building.

3.9 billion people—half of the world’s population—currently live in cities globally. It is projected that 5 billion people will live in cities by 2030.  Cities across the world occupy just 3 percent of the Earth's land, yet account for 60–80 percent of energy consumption and 75 percent of carbon emissions. Increased urbanization requires increased and improved access to basic resources such as food, energy and water. In addition, basic services such as sanitation, health, education, mobility and information are needed. However, these requirements are unmet globally, which causes serious challenges for the viability and safety of cities to meet increased future demands.

SDG 11 represents a shift in international development cooperation from a focus on poverty as a rural phenomenon to recognizing that cities, especially in the global south, are facing major challenges with extreme poverty, environmental degradation and risks due to climate change and natural disasters. Despite its ambiguous targets and goals, is still an important tool for addressing urban challenges and calls for actors to develop realistic, locally defined indicators and outputs to fit the urban context of specific cities to promote more sustainable, inclusive and equal cities.

Background 

In September 2015, the General Assembly adopted the 2030 Agenda for Sustainable Development that included 17 Sustainable Development Goals [connect to the general SDG page]. These goals are designed to be a “blueprint to achieve a better and more sustainable future for all” through addressing global challenges, including those 
related to poverty, inequality, climate change, environmental degradation, peace and justice. In September 2019, Heads of State and Government came together during the SDG Summit to renew their commitment to implement the 2030 Agenda for Sustainable Development. During this event, they acknowledged that the first four years of the implementation of the 2030 Agenda included major progress, but that overall, the world is not on track to deliver the SDGs.

SDG 11 addresses slums, human settlement management and planning, climate change mitigation and adaptation, and urban economies. Prior to the adoption of the 2030 Agenda, Millennium Development Goal 7, target 4, called for efforts to achieve a "significant improvement in the lives of at least 100 million slum dwellers" by 2020.

In 2008, for the first time in history, the global urban population outnumbered the rural population. This milestone marked the beginning of a new 'urban millennium' and, by 2050, two-thirds of the world population are expected to be living in urban areas. The number of urban residents increases by nearly 73 million every year, and it is estimated that urban areas account for 70 per cent of the world's gross domestic product, generating a large share of economic growth. Thus, sustainable development cannot be achieved without significantly transforming the way we build and manage our urban spaces.

The unprecedented growth of cities, coupled with increasing rural to urban migration resulting from a combination of “push” and “pull” factors, has led to a boom in mega-cities, especially in the developing world. In 1990, there were ten mega-cities with 10 million inhabitants or more, and in 2014, there were 28 mega-cities, home to a total of 453 million people. Slums are also becoming a more significant feature of urban life. Between 2000 and 2014, the absolute number of people living in slums went from 792 million in 2000 to an estimated 880 million in 2014. Most of them are found in Eastern and South-Eastern Asia. In the next 30 years, 90% of urban growth is anticipated to happen in Asia and Africa. Rapid urbanization worldwide is exerting pressure on fresh water supplies, sewage, the living environment, and public health.

The vast majority of research that pertains to the topic of SDG 11 comes from the United States, United Kingdom and China. Environmental science and social sciences fields see the most research with regard to Sustainable Development Goal 11, followed by medicine, energy and engineering.

Targets, indicators and progress 

The UN has defined 10 targets and 15 indicators for SDG 11. Targets specify the goals, and indicators represent the metrics by which the world aims to track whether these targets are achieved. Six of them are to be achieved by the year 2030 and one by the year 2020 and three have no target years. Each of the targets also has one or two indicators which will be used to measure progress.

Target 11.1: Safe and affordable housing 

The full title of Target 11.1 is "By 2030, ensure access for all to adequate, safe and affordable housing and basic services and upgrade slums".

This target has one Indicator: Indicator 11.1.1 is the "Proportion of the urban population living in slum households".

People who live in slums have no access to improved water, access to improved sanitation, sufficient living area, and durable housing.

Target 11.1 is to ensure access to safe and affordable housing by 2030. The indicator to measure progress toward this target is the proportion of urban population living in slums or informal settlements. Between 2000 and 2014, the proportion fell from 39 percent to 30 percent. However, the absolute number of people living in slums went from 792 million in 2000 to an estimated 880 million in 2014. Movement from rural to urban areas has accelerated as the population has grown and better housing alternatives are available.

A sustainable transportation system considers different socioeconomic groups' travel concerns to achieve the validity of accessibility metrics. According to the Bogota research, transportation and transportation planning should be coordinated with land use planning. Employment and residential areas are relatively concentrated, and urban and suburban settings should be planned and reconstructed in concert.

Target 11.2: Affordable and sustainable transport systems 

The full text of Target 11.2 is "By 2030, provide access to safe, affordable, accessible and sustainable transport systems for all, improving road safety, notably by expanding public transport, with special attention to the needs of those in vulnerable situations, women, children, persons with disabilities and older persons".

This target has one Indicator: Indicator 11.2.1 is the "Proportion of population that has convenient access to public transport, by sex, age and Persons With Disabilities". Improving transport systems to refine the use of accessibility is key because due to physical or mental disabilities, impaired sight or hearing, carrying heavy bags or traveling with small children, as this causes an average of 25% of the population to experience a degree of reduced mobility.

One of the main issues that arises in providing access to transport systems for all has been in many urban areas lacking coordination between local authorities and public transport operators. Welza

Target 11.3: Inclusive and sustainable urbanization 
The full-text Target 11.3 is "By 2030, enhance inclusive and sustainable urbanization and capacity for participatory, integrated and sustainable human settlement planning and management in all countries".

The target has two indicators:

 Indicator 11.3.1: "Ratio of land consumption rate to the population growth rate"

Over long periods of time according to a variety of environmental, political, and social conditions land-use practices are developed. Land being used for infrastructural and developmental activities can differ due to the demand for resources and socioeconomic factors. Managing the ratio of land consumption rate to the population growth rate is vital because of the effects of urban sprawl which occurs when there is a migration of population to new regions. In such cases agricultural and vacant land becomes occupied as the population grows which occasionally leads to the conversion of agricultural land to urban settlements, deforestation, or rural areas converting to urban areas. Therefore, creating a greater method to sustainable urbanization and managing human settlements is significant with population growth.

 Indicator 11.3.2: "Proportion of cities with a direct participation structure of civil society in urban planning and management that operate regularly and democratically"

Indicator 11.3.2 may be challenging to calculate as direct participation in accordance with urban planning requires the implication that constructive relations are practiced with countries or city administrators. However, only 20 out of 211 countries have a direct democracy  which implies that “citizens through their representatives are tasked with co-designing policies to be discussed in public and later voted on by the public”.

There are currently no data available for this indicator.

Target 11.4: "Protect the world's cultural and natural heritage" 
The full text of Target 11.4 is "Strengthen efforts to protect and safeguard the world's cultural and natural heritage."

It has one indicator: Indicator 11.4.1 is the "Total per capita expenditure on the preservation, protection and conservation of all cultural and natural heritage, by the source of funding (public, private), type of heritage (cultural, natural) and level of government (national, regional, and local/municipal)".

Urban spaces should add efforts in preserving cultural and natural heritage as it can bring pride to a community and may be used to capitalize on the heritage or used as a marketing tool. The use of urban archaeology may be an option to explore to strengthen cultural heritage. Material culture, artifacts, building foundations, food remains, gardens, pathways and bridges can be further studied by urban archeologists to understand the history and diversity which lives in the urban space.

This indicator can be difficult to calculate for the following reasons: Countries' national accounting frameworks may not clearly separate cultural, natural, and other activities; financial transactions may be rechanneled for different uses; financial transactions may be double-counted at different levels of public administration.

There are currently no data available for this indicator.

Target 11.5: "Reduce the adverse effects of natural disasters" 

The full text of Target 11.5 is "By 2030, significantly reduce the number of deaths and the number of people affected and substantially decrease the direct economic losses relative to global gross domestic product caused by disasters, including water-related disasters, with a focus on protecting the poor and people in vulnerable situations".

Indicators are:
 Indicator 11.5.1: "Number of deaths, missing persons and directly affected persons attributed to disasters per 100,000 population. Indicators measured here report mortality rates internally displaced persons, missing persons and total numbers affected by natural disasters"
 Indicator 11.5.2: "Direct economic loss in relation to global GDP, damage to critical infrastructure and the number of disruptions to basic services, attributed to disasters."

According to a recent report released by Aon, at least 416 notable natural disaster events occurred on a regional, peril, or event-level scale in addition to pandemic-related events in 2020, which was higher than the average (384) and median (390) since 2000. The estimated direct economic losses and damages caused by these natural disasters were about US$268 billion, which was higher than the average of the 21st century by 29%.

The Emergency Events Database (EM-DAT) records show from 1970 to 2019, 50% of all disasters were weather, climate, and water hazards, and these disasters were accountable for 45% of all reported deaths (2.06 million), 74% of all reported economic losses (US$3.6 trillion).

In addition, continued climate change, and global warming would likely increase both the frequency and intensity of weather-, climate-related hazards, like floods, hurricanes, storms and lead to tremendous economic loss and deaths. Around 32 – 79 million people will be exposed to coastal flooding If the global temperature increases by 2 °C.

Target 11.6: "Reduce the environmental impacts of cities" 

The full text of Target 11.6 is "By 2030, reduce the adverse per capita environmental impact of cities, including by paying special attention to air quality and municipal and other waste management."

The target has two indicators:

 Indicator 11.6.1: Proportion of municipal solid waste collected and managed in controlled facilities out of total municipal waste generated, by cities

The use of “zero waste” cities can be useful to implement within cities as it suggests the concept of recycling 100% of waste to mitigate the harmful waste produced by the city. As waste management systems are political, environmental, socio-economic, and technological, there may be challenges faced achieving indicator 11.6.1 as these factors create interrelated and dynamic inherited features. As waste management systems are political, environmental, socio-economic, and technological, there may be challenges faced achieving indicator 11.6.1 as these factors create interrelated and dynamic inherited features.

 Indicator 11.6.2: "Annual mean levels of fine particulate matter (e.g. PM2.5 and PM10) in cities (population weighted)"

Particulate matter (PM) in the air can affect the cardiovascular system and other major organs. Chronic exposure will lead to further health risks.

Target 11.7: "Provide access to safe and inclusive green and public spaces" 
The full text of Target 11.7 is: "By 2030, provide universal access to safe, inclusive and accessible, green and public spaces, in particular for women and children, older persons and Persons With Disabilities"

The two indicators include:

 The Indicator 11.7.1: "Average share of the built-up area of cities that is open space for public use for all, by sex, age and persons with disabilities"
 The Indicator 11.7.2: "Proportion of person victim of physical or sexual harassment, by sex, age, disability status and place of occurrence, in the previous 12 months"

University campuses are found to have great potential to contribute to urban green areas development. Green spaces play an important role in improving quality of life and reducing stress and improving overall well-being, they have increasingly become an integrated part of the university campus.

Universities also are widely recognized as a key driver of sustainability practices promotion, research, personal involvement, achievement of SDG goals through educational establishment.

Target 11.a: "Strong national and regional development planning" 
The full text of Target 11.a is "Support positive economic, social and environmental links between urban, peri-urban and rural areas by strengthening national and regional development planning".

It has one indicator: Indicator 11.a.1 is the "Number of countries that have national urban policies or regional development plans that (a) respond to population dynamics; (b) ensure balanced territorial development, and (c) increase local fiscal space."

This indicator is one of the key metrics to benchmark and monitors urbanization. It can serve as a gap analysis to support policy recommendations. Data sources for this indicator may include: Official documents such as National Urban Plan available in national and regional administrations, point of service surveys, database of national urban policies by United Nations, UrbanLex, a database of laws and policies on urban matters developed by UN-Habitat.

There are currently no data available for this indicator.

The New Urban Agenda was adopted by world leaders in 2016 and serves as a powerful tool for sustainable urban development for both developing and developed countries by providing a series of standards for sustainable urban development.
 
In this agenda, world leaders are committed to:
 Provide basic services for all citizens
 Ensure that all citizens have access to equal opportunities and face no discrimination
 Promote measures that support cleaner cities
 Strengthen resilience in cities to reduce the risk and the impact of disasters
 Taken action to address climate change by reducing their greenhouse gas emissions
 Full respect the rights of refugees, migrants and internally displaced persons regardless of their migration status
 Improve connectivity and support innovative and green initiatives
 Promote safe, accessible and green public spaces

Target 11.b: "Implement policies for inclusion, resource efficiency and disaster risk reduction" 

The full text of Target 11.b is "By 2020, substantially increase the number of cities and human settlements adopting and implementing integrated policies and plans towards inclusion, resource efficiency, mitigation and adaptation to climate change, resilience to disasters, and develop and implement, in line with the Sendai Framework for Disaster risk reduction 2015–2030, holistic disaster risk management at all levels."

Unlike most SDGs which have the target year of 2030, this indicator is set to be achieved by 2020.

The two indicators include:
 Indicator 11.b.1: "Number of countries that adopt and implement national disaster risk reduction strategies in line with the Sendai Framework for Disaster Risk Reduction 2015–2030"
 Indicator 11.b.2: "Proportion of local governments that adopt and implement local disaster risk reduction strategies in line with national disaster risk reduction strategies"

Recently, a number of challenges in implementing the Sendai Framework for Disaster Risk Reduction have been identified, including inconsistent, unstructured, disorganized data collection and reporting, the lack of incentives for proactive report disaster loss, and the lack of governmental mandate on disaster loss reporting.

Target 11.c: Support least developed countries in sustainable and resilient building 
The full text of Target 11.c is formulated as "Support least developed countries, including through financial and technical assistance, in building sustainable and resilient buildings using local materials".

This target has one Indicator: Indicator 11.c.1 is the "Proportion of financial support to the least developed countries that is allocated to the construction and retrofitting of sustainable, resilient and resource-efficient buildings using local materials".

At the fifteen session of the Conference of the Parties (COP15) in 2009, developed countries pledged to provide US$100 billion a year by 2020 to help developing countries to develop climate change mitigation and adaptation, yet this commitment has not yet been fulfilled in 2021.
 
At the UN Climate Change Conference in Glasgow (COP26) in 2021, a number of countries made new climate finance commitments.
 Canada has committed to doubling of its climate finance support to $5.3 billion between 2020 and 2025.
 The US has pledged to offer $11.4 billion per year by 2024, as well as $3 billion specifically for climate adaptation.
 Spain will increase its climate finance pledge by 50% to $1.55 billion a year from 2025.

A proposal has been tabled in 2020 to delete Indicator 11.c.1.

Custodian agencies 
The custodian agencies are responsible for data gathering and reporting on the indicators:

 For the indicators of Targets 11.1, 11.2 and 11.3 and also for Indicator 11.a.1 and Indicator 11.c.1: United Nations Human Settlements Programme (UN-HABITAT)
 For Indicator 11.4.1: United Nations Educational, Scientific, and Cultural Organization-Institute for Statistics (UNESCO-UIS)
 For the two indicators under Target 11.5 and for Indicator 11.b.2: United Nations International Strategy for Disaster Reduction (UNISDR)
 For Indicator 11.6.1: United Nations Human Settlements Programme (UN-HABITAT), Department of Economic and Social Affairs (DESA) and UNSD 
 For Indicator 11.6.2: World Health Organization

Monitoring and Progress 
High-level progress reports are prepared by United Nations Secretary General annually, evaluating the progress towards all the Sustainable Development Goals. The most recent report was published in 2021. The previous report was from April 2020.

In 2018, High-level Political Forum (HLPF) took stock of progress on the Sustainable Development Goals and discussed progress, successes, challenges and lessons learned on the road to a fairer, more peaceful and prosperous world and a healthy planet by 2030. SDG 11 was one of the six SDGs discussed in depth.

The progress on the SDG 11 has been stalled by the COVID-19 pandemic. Due to the direct and indirect impacts of the pandemic, this Goal is increasingly less likely to be achieved in a timely manner. As of 30 April 2021, this is the progress made toward the Sustainable Development Goal 11.

All the UN member states are committed to following up their progress towards implementing the 2030 Agenda and its goals and targets. Almost all the UN member states have presented their national progress towards the SDGs through Voluntary National Review (VNR). Despite the importance of cities within the sustainable development framework, only a few initiatives have emerged to assess progress towards the SDGs on a city scale. Voluntary Local Review (VLR) could be a suitable approach to advance the progress of SDG implementation through localization of global development goals and sustainable development agenda. Both the Sendai Framework and New Urban Agenda point out that urban areas are in an excellent position to take the initiative to manage several of the persistent global challenges like pollution and environmental degradation.

The number of slum dwellers reached more than 1 billion in 2018, or 24 per cent of the urban population. The number of people living in urban slums is highest in Eastern and South-Eastern Asia, sub-Saharan Africa and Central and Southern Asia. In 2019, only half of the world's urban population had convenient access to public transport, defined as living within 500 metres' walking distance from a low-capacity transport system (such as a bus stop) and within 1 km of a high-capacity transport system (such as a railway). In the period 1990–2015, most urban areas recorded a general increase in the extent of built-up area per person.

Challenges

Impacts of COVID-19 pandemic 
Cities in many countries have become epicentres of COVID-19. Approximately 60% of COVID-19 cases have been found in urban areas, shedding light onto the function of cities in generating and accelerating the pandemic.  Population growth, combined with pull factors of cities, such as concentration of economic activities and availability of services, results in increased rates of urbanization. This urbanization is coupled with subsequent congestion and increased human mobility within cities and countries. Importantly, both congestion and increased mobility have been named as some of the major contributors to the spread of epidemics through aerosols, droplets and fomities. SDG 11 has proven to be of critical importance during the COVID-19 pandemic by ensuring a reduction in exposure to those living in crowded areas.

Cultural and natural heritage is an important economic driver, especially for developing countries. With a 98% fall in the number of international arrivals in 2020 compared to 2019 due to the COVID-19 pandemic, the tourism industry and the cultural heritage sector have endured significant losses.

COVID-19 causes more severe diseases in homeless individuals, and they are unable to obtain adequate sleep, keep social distance, or have safe water to drink, all of which contribute to their losing their employment and having no source of money, which is also the cause of their homelessness. The digital divide between urban and rural areas and the closure of places of worship exacerbate inequalities and negative impacts. The challenges posed by COVID-19 demonstrate the importance of resilient, inclusive, resilient, and sustainable cities.

Controlling the spread of COVID-19 is more difficult under economic inequality. The safety of public transportation systems is essential for low-income communities, most of whom rely on public transportation services for their travel. Then safe, affordable, and sustainable transportation systems are especially important.

COVID-19 is more likely to spread in overcrowded urbanization, where growing populations and migration lead to rapid urban sprawl. As a result, unplanned urbanization that neglects low-income populations drives the expansion of informal settlements and accelerates the growth of the informal economy.

The COVID-19 pandemic has illuminated the deeply rooted inequalities in the cities, which is reflected in disproportionate pandemic-related impacts on migrants, the homeless, and the residents of urban slums and informal settlements. COVID-19 has revealed pre-existing patterns of health disparities across different groups, with Pacific Islander, Latino, Indigenous and Black Americans experiencing "a COVID-19 death rate of double or more that of White and Asian Americans". Further, a positive association between previous prolonged exposure to air pollution and the severity of COVID-19 infection and rates of morbidity related to COVID-19 has been suggested. Therefore, the success of SDG 11 post-pandemic requires concerted action on the part of Governments at all levels, civil society and development partners.

During the crisis, cities have emerged as drivers of economic recovery, centres of innovation and catalysts for social and economic transformation. Smart city technologies and solutions have contributed to resilience in cities by facilitating gathering and exchange of information in real time, decreasing risk, and enhancing planning, absorption and adaptation abilities. Robots and drones were used to clean and disinfect spaces, measure patient’s temperature, deliver medicine and food, and to track or detect high-risk areas. Evidence from Chinese cities shows that smart city projects have helped the prevention and control of COVID-19 pandemic. Namely, for every 1 million yuan increase in smart city investment per 10,000 people, the number of COVID-19 confirmed cases per 10,000 people decreased by 0.342. Further development of smart city projects is expected to provide opportunities for increasing resilience to the COVID-19 pandemic and any similar events in the future.

Links with other SDGs 
SDG 11 interlinks with many of the other SDGs. First, the impact on health (SDG 3, Target 3.9) of city dwellers, as well as improve cities resilience to natural and climate change-induced disasters. It is related to SDG 6 (target 6.1, 6.2 and 6.5), SDG 12 (target 12.4), SDG 14 (target 14.3) Lastly, reducing the impact of communicable diseases and maternal and children mortality which can be found under SDG 3 (targets 3.2 and 3.3).

An essential aspect of SDG11 is "affordability" so that vulnerable people are considered in urban planning. The emphasis on disadvantaged groups is reflected in SDG11 goals 11.1, 11.2, 11.3, and 11.7. It reinforces the need for "equity" to be mentioned and subconsciously considered in the development of SDG 11.​​ SDG11 and SDG10 are inextricably linked.

Furthermore, SDG 11 interlinks with SDG 13 on climate action: The world's cities account for 60–80 per cent of energy consumption and 75 per cent of carbon emissions (this is because 4.2 billion people, or 55 percent of the world's population, lived in cities in 2018).

Sustainable and economical transportation networks may successfully reduce carbon emissions (SDG 13), assist in addressing inhabitants with low incomes or other structural inequalities (SDG 10), and promote healthy lifestyles and well-being (SDG 3).

Active modes of transport (walking, cycling and other types of wheeled transport) can be a low-cost way to access essential services (Target 11.4), especially when combined with cheap and effective public transport. The government's targeted investment in bicycle paths and sidewalks is an essential transportation planning policy, which guides travelling for short trips. In order to address inequities in and access to health services, improve the urban environment by making safe and accessible active transport, including wheelchair access, and better public transport more possible. Increasing pedestrian and bicycle traffic in streets and parks, with an emphasis on crime prevention through urban design, lighting, visibility, fence options and plants, helps to reduce crime, particularly sexual assault (SDG 5.2). Streamlining the planning approval process for SHA (Special Housing Area) projects in Ontario(Canada) can accelerate the development of sustainable community goals. Public housing rents, charged as a percentage of household income, can be effective in reducing inequality(SDG10). Affordable and sustainable transportation systems and safe urban environments can minimize inequalities.

Organizations

UN system 
 United for Smart Sustainable Cities Initiative (U4SSC) which has been pilot to monitor urban-environment related Sustainable Development Goals (SDGs) projects
 Inter-American Development Bank (IDB)
 UN Industrial Development Organization (UNIDO)
 UN Economic Commission for Africa (ECA)
 United Nations International Strategy for Disaster Reduction (UNISDR)
United Nations Human Settlements Programme.

NGOs and others 
The following NGOs and other organizations are helping to achieve SDG 11:

 GoFar, founded by Danny Adams, is a Sydney Founder Institute portfolio company. It helps to cut emissions produced by vehicles, as well as improve driver safety. GoFar has a unique app and in-car device that provides drivers with real-time feedback to help them reduce fuel consumption.
 C40 cities is a network of the world's megacities committed to addressing climate change, It is taking bold climate action and leading the way towards having a more sustainable future. C40 also offers cities an effective forum to collaborate, share knowledge and drive meaningful action on climate change.
 ICLEI is committed to sustainable urban development. It helps members to make their cities and regions sustainable, low-carbon, resilient, ecomobile, biodiverse, resource-efficient and healthy, with a green economy and smart infrastructure.
 100RC developed by the Rockefeller Foundation helps cities around the world to become more resilient to physical, social, and economic shocks and stresses and it supports the adoption and incorporation of a view of resilience that includes not just the shocks, earthquakes, fires, floods, but also the stresses that weaken the fabric of a city on a day to day or cyclical basis.
 CHWs(Community health workers) are an important player in primary health care, helping cities to use flexible coordination mechanisms, define roles for stakeholders and interface with national health policies, and increase investment in human resources.

Examples at country level

Canada 

The Canadian federal government has allotted $10 billion CAD over 3 years to the Canadian Infrastructure Bank to begin investing in green projects across the country focusing on areas such as transit, renewable energy, and building retrofits. The federal government is meeting its SDG 11.2 and SDG 11a targets by investing $1.5 billion in public transit and having 5000 busses in the next 5 years within a wider uplifting growth strategy to refocus the inequalities faced by different urban and rural regions in Canada. The federal government has also seen a slight rise in the proportion of the urban population that lives in inadequate housing, rising from 12.5% in 2011 to 12.7% in 2016, moving away from lowering the goal of adequate housing.

See also
Climate change and cities
List of most-polluted cities by particulate matter concentration

References

External links 
 UN Sustainable Development Knowledge Platform – SDG 11
 "Global Goals" Campaign – SDG 11 
 SDG-Track.org – SDG 11
 UN SDG 11 in the US

Sustainable development
Sustainable Development Goals